Pilade may refer to:

 Lorenzo Pilat, an Italian singer-songwriter also known as Pilade
 Pilade, a character in the 1819 opera Ermione by Rossini 
 Pilade, or Pylades, a character in the 1779 opera Iphigénie en Tauride by Gluck
 , formerly French Navy brig Pylade or Pilade

See also
 Pylades, in Greek mythology
 Pilades, a genus of beetles
 , formerly Batavian corvette or sloop Pilades
 Pilates